Only Living Witness was an American metal band from Boston, Massachusetts, formed in 1989 by members of dissolved thrash metal band Formicide. Across two studio albums, they developed a groove-oriented hardcore punk-influenced heavy metal sound. The band spilt up in 1995.

Career 
The band was formed in 1989 in Boston, Massachusetts, by Jonah Jenkins (vocals) and Eric Stevenson (drums, ex-Formicide). Stevenson's brother Kevin (guitar) and former Formicide bandmate Roy Costa (bass) completed the lineup. In 1991, Kevin Stevenson and Costa were replaced by Craig Silverman and Chris Crowley. Kevin Stevenson and Costa went on to form The Shods. 

Only Living Witness released a few demos before being signed by Century Media Records. Their debut album, Prone Mortal Form, was released in 1993. The band performed concerts in 14 countries including Sweden, England, France, Canada, Italy, Switzerland, and the Czech Republic. In 1996, their follow-up CD Innocents was released, but the band had already split up.

Following the band's dissolution in 1995, Jonah Jenkins went on to perform the vocal duties in Miltown, Milligram and Raw Radar War. Guitarist Craig Silverman went on to play in bands Blood for Blood, Ramallah, Slapshot, and Agnostic Front.

Only Living Witness briefly reformed in 2008 for four reunion shows: June 14 and 21 at The Middle East in Cambridge, Massachusetts, August 22 in Clinton, Massachusetts, and the final show on August 30 in Eindhoven, Netherlands. 

Eric Stevenson, the band's main composer and drummer, died on August 9, 2011, at the age of 43.

Legacy 

Only Living Witness would prove to be influential to the wave of metalcore acts that also came out of Massachusetts some years later. Some of those bands include Killswitch Engage, Shadows Fall and Unearth, to name a few.

In 2014, Shadows Fall's cover of the Only Living Witness song "December" was used in the soundtrack of the film Let's Be Cops.

Members 
 Jonah Jenkins – vocals (1989–1995)
 Eric Stevenson – drums (1989–1995)
 Kevin Stevenson – guitar (1989–1991)
 Roy Costa – bass (1989–1991)
 Craig Silverman – guitar (1991–1995)
 Chris Crowley – bass (1991–1995)

US Reunion, Clinton, MA and Netherlands show 2008
Bob Maloney – bass guitar

Clinton, MA and Netherlands show 2008
Benny Grotto – drums

Discography

Demos 
1990  Self-titled demo (audio cassette)

1992  Prone Mortal Form demo (audio cassette)

Singles 
1991
 Complex Man 7" limited press of 1,000 copies (Look Again Records)

1995
 Freaklaw 7" limited press of 3,000 copies (Chainsaw Safety Records)

Compilation appearances 
1991
 Planned Obsolescence compilation (RRRecords)
Have contributed with the track Bad Blood

1993
 East Coast Assault compilation (Too Damn Hype Records)
Have contributed with the track Twitching Tongues

1994
 Case Closed?: An International Compilation of Husker Du Cover Songs (Snoop Records)
Have contributed with the track Too Far Down

1995
 Bloodlines: The Seeds of Rebellion compilation (Century Media Records)
Have contributed with the track Deed's Pride

 Boston Hardcore '89-'91 (Taang! Records)
Have contributed with the track Bad Blood

References 

Heavy metal musical groups from Massachusetts
Musical groups established in 1989